Tiemann is a surname. Notable people with the surname include:

Daniel F. Tiemann (1805–1899), mayor of New York
Dietlind Tiemann (born 1955), German politician (CDU)
Edmund C. Tiemann (1922–2009), American businessman, politician, and military officer
Ferdinand Tiemann (1848–1899),German chemist and discoverer of the Reimer-Tiemann reaction
Norbert Tiemann (1924–2012), American politician
Marcel Tiemann (born 1974), German racing driver
Neal Tiemann (born 1982), American guitarist
Michael Tiemann, free software programmer
Robert L. Tiemann, American baseball historian and author
Otto Tiemann (1890–1952), German Wehrmacht general

See also
Tiemann's catheter

de:Tiemann